The Alpine distress signal is a distress signal in the case of mountain emergency, an emergency in alpine areas. There are also special emergency call numbers, for use with the telephone service by which the emergency services can be contacted.

The Alpine distress signal
The Alpine distress signal was introduced in 1894 on the suggestion of Clinton Thomas Dent and was soon adopted internationally. 

The Alpine distress signal traditionally consists of a signal by blasts from a whistle (may also be an air horn), which is repeated six times in the minute (every ten seconds). It is to be repeated after one minute of break in same manner.

The reply to such a signal is given with three successive indications per minute and likewise repeated after one minute of break. Thus it can be confirmed to the person/party in trouble that its distress signal was received.

Whoever receives distress signals, should confirm and alert the emergency services.

The distress signal can also be a sound, light, or visible signs:
Audible signals: e.g. loud calling, whistles, yodeling (Deep tones are audible over a long distance.)
Optical signals: e.g. blinkers, sunlight mirrors, flares, flames
Visible signs with remarkable articles of clothing, branches, smoke, etc.

Any abuse of emergency signals may lead to prosecution.

Ground to air signaling
To communicate with a helicopter in sight, raise both arms (forming the letter Y) to indicate "Yes" or "I need help," or stretch one arm up and one down (imitating the letter N) for "No" or "I do not need help". If semaphore flags are available, they can possibly be used to communicate with rescuers. This is important if the helicopter is searching for a missing party to avoid confusion.

See also 
International Commission for Alpine Rescue

External links
Mountain Rescue Association of Slovenia (GRZS) 

Alps
Mountain rescue